Savaale Samaali is a 2015 Indian Tamil language comedy drama film written and directed by Sathyasiva. The film stars Ashok Selvan and Bindu Madhavi while Nassar, Jagan, and Karunas play supporting roles. Produced by actor C. Arunpandian, the film features music composed by S. Thaman. The film began production in June 2014 under the working title Kekae Bokae and released on 4 September 2015.

Plot 
Karthik  gets a job at a TV channel called Top TV, but no one watches it. He is also attracted towards his sister Pooja's friend Divya and tries to impress her with the help of his work colleague Billa, but she does not reciprocate his love. Meanwhile, the debt-ridden channel’s boss Karunakaran tries to commits suicide and requests Karthik and Billa to find a way to get the channel to the top position and increase their overall TRP. The duo hits upon the idea of uniting lovers facing parental opposition through a reality show, but they fake the whole thing with Koothu actors. Meanwhile, Divya asks Karthik to help unite a real couple whose fathers are powerful politicians, and how they succeed in uniting the couple forms the remainder of the plot.

Cast

Production 
The collaboration was announced in May 2014, when Arun Pandian chose to finance a venture to be directed by Sathyasiva featuring Ashok Selvan and Bindu Madhavi. Production on the film began in June 2014, with Ashok Selvan announcing that he rejected over 40 scripts post the success of Thegidi (2014), before selecting Sathyasiva's film.

Music 
The film features five tracks composed by S. Thaman and lyrics written by Snehan.

References

External links 
 

2015 films
Indian comedy-drama films
2010s Tamil-language films
Films scored by Thaman S
Films directed by Sathyasiva
2015 comedy-drama films